Muhammad Abdul Nasir is an Indian politician and former member of the Manipur Legislative Assembly representing Lilong. He had served as the Minister of Agriculture in the Okram Ibobi Singh cabinet.

Political career 
Nasir was elected to Manipur Legislative Assembly in 2017 as a candidate of Lilong as a candidate of the Indian National Congress. In 2018, he faced difficulty with constructing his house in Nagaram village where the local tribal people do not sell land to outsiders and wanted to halt the construction of his house.

Nasir resigned in 2020 along with five other politicians of Indian National Congress. He defected to Janata Dal (United).

He won 2022 Manipur Legislative Assembly election from Lilong.

References 

Living people
Manipur politicians
Manipur MLAs 2017–2022
Manipur MLAs 2012–2017
Manipur MLAs 2022–2027
Year of birth missing (living people)